Finlay Robertson (born 2 May 1975) is a British actor.

Life and career
Robertson was born in the Netherlands to Scottish parents, and grew up in England. He studied history at Cambridge University.

Robertson has more than 40 screen credits, and has been a regular cast member in series including Channel 4 drama NY-LON, ITV drama Life Begins, BBC Three sitcom How Not to Live Your Life, the ITV comedy drama Doc Martin and the BBC One crime drama The Body Farm. Robertson was also a guest star of the Doctor Who episode, "Blink". Robertson has appeared in films, including Alfie, The Disappeared, F, Cockneys vs Zombies, and Hammer of the Gods. Robertson's roles in recent years include the drama series New Tricks, Scott & Bailey, and the docu-drama I Shouldn't Be Alive.
In March 2021, Robertson reprised his role as Laurence Nightingale in the Doctor Who Spin-off game: The Lonely Assassins, which is a sequel to the Episode Blink, that he guest-starred in, in 2007.

Robertson lives in North London with his wife and family.

References

External links
 

1975 births
Living people
20th-century British male actors
21st-century British male actors
British male television actors
Place of birth missing (living people)